Erupa is a genus of moths of the family Crambidae.

Species
Erupa adiposalis (Dognin, 1912)
Erupa argentescens Hampson, 1896
Erupa argentilinea Druce, 1910
Erupa argyrosticta (Hampson, 1919)
Erupa bilineatella (Walker, 1866)
Erupa chiloides Walker, 1864
Erupa chilopsisina Schaus, 1922
Erupa cluaca Druce, 1900
Erupa congruella (Walker, 1866)
Erupa digrammica Hampson, 1919
Erupa discordella Schaus, 1913
Erupa eambardella (Schaus, 1922)
Erupa gigantea Druce, 1900
Erupa gyges Druce, 1900
Erupa herstanellus (Schaus, 1922)
Erupa huarmellus Schaus, 1922
Erupa impunctella Schaus, 1922
Erupa invidella Schaus, 1913
Erupa lactealis Hampson, 1896
Erupa luceria Druce, 1902
Erupa nampa Schaus, 1929
Erupa nigrescentella Hampson, 1896
Erupa olorana Schaus, 1934
Erupa patara Druce, 1902
Erupa plumbealis Hampson, 1919
Erupa pravella Schaus, 1913
Erupa prodigialis (Zeller, 1877)
Erupa puncticilialis Hampson, 1919
Erupa rhaetia Druce, 1900
Erupa ruptilineella Hampson, 1896
Erupa schoenobina Hampson, 1919
Erupa similis Druce, 1899
Erupa somenella Schaus, 1922
Erupa teinopalpia (Hampson, 1913)
Erupa titana Druce, 1910
Erupa titanalis C. Felder, R. Felder & Rogenhofer, 1875

References

Erupini
Crambidae genera
Taxa named by Francis Walker (entomologist)